I Love Jenni is an American reality television series on Universo that debuted on March 5, 2011, and concluded on August 11, 2013. I Love Jenni documents the personal and professional life of Mexican-American singer Jenni Rivera and those close to her.

Season 3 of I Love Jenni acquired enough viewers to make it the most-watched Universo original program in the network's history. It finished as the fifth-most-watched program with Hispanic females 18–49 and seventh-most-watched series with Hispanic adults 18–49.

Production
The first two seasons revolve around Jenni's family and their personal lives in Encino, Los Angeles, and Jenni's life as a recording artist. Jenni announced on Twitter in November 2012 that filming of the third season had begun. On December 9, 2012, Rivera died in a plane crash after a sold-out performance in Arena Monterrey. The production team of the show had been traveling with her and filmed her entire last concert. It was confirmed in January 2013 that the third season would continue and that it would feature footage of Rivera in the month prior to her death and the family would continue filming the rest of the third season which will encompass them as they move on from Jenni's death. Rivera's children Chiquis, Jacqie, Michael, Jenicka and Johnny, are featured, as well as her sister, Rosie Rivera. The third and final season debuted on April 14, 2013.

Cast

Main
 Jenni Rivera
 Janney 'Chiquis' Marin
 Jacqie Campos
 Michael Marin
 Juan Angel Lopez
 Jenicka Lopez
 Jaylah Hope Yanez
 Rosie Rivera (3)
 Esteban Loaiza (1-2)

Recurring
 Pete Salgado
 Juan Rivera
 Rosa Saavedra
 Gerald Gamble
 Drea Ibarra
 Luna Amira Marin
 Julie Vasquez

Episodes

Season 1 (2011)

Season 2 (2012)

Season 3 (2013)

Spin-offs

Chiquis 'N Control 
The success of I Love Jenni  led to the announcement of Jenni Rivera Presents: Chiquis 'N Control, a spin-off starring Rivera's firstborn daughter, Chiquis, as she moves out of her mother's house and opens a blow-dry salon. Chiquis 'N Control premiered on July 28, 2012, on Universo and aired through the summer. It was the only program to outperform I Love Jenni before it returned in April 2013 for its third and final season.

The Riveras 
In May 2016, Universo announced a reality show titled The Riveras, featuring Jenni's five children. The Riveras focuses on Rivera's children, Chiquis, Jacqie, Michael, Jenicka, and Juan Angel as they begin to pursue their dreams and continue to honor their mother's legacy. The Riveras premiered on October 16, 2016, on Universo.

References

External links
 

2010s American reality television series
2011 American television series debuts
2013 American television series endings
Jenni Rivera